Bambanani Nolufefe Mbane (born 12 March 1990) is a South African soccer player who plays as a midfielder for Mamelodi Sundowns and the South Africa women's national team.

References

1990 births
Living people
Women's association football midfielders
Women's association football defenders
South African women's soccer players
People from Senqu Local Municipality
South Africa women's international soccer players
2019 FIFA Women's World Cup players
Olympic soccer players of South Africa
Footballers at the 2016 Summer Olympics
South African expatriate soccer players
South African expatriates in Belarus
Expatriate women's footballers in Belarus